Michael Joseph Cullen (born 3 July 1931) is a Scottish former footballer, most noted as a player for Luton Town and Grimsby Town.

Playing career
Cullen was born in Glasgow. At the age of 17, he signed for English Second Division side Luton Town in 1948. In 1956, he became the only Luton Town player ever to be capped by Scotland. He was sold to Grimsby Town in 1958, and after a successful spell there he moved on to Derby County. He moved on to Wellington Town, where he played out his career.

References

External links

1931 births
Living people
Footballers from Glasgow
English Football League players
Scotland international footballers
Scottish footballers
Luton Town F.C. players
Grimsby Town F.C. players
Derby County F.C. players
Telford United F.C. players
Association football wingers
Scotland B international footballers